Manothrix  is a genus of plants in thefamily Apocynaceae, first described as a genus in 1878. The entire genus is endemic to Brazil.

Species
 Manothrix nodosa Miers  
 Manothrix valida Miers

References

Asclepiadoideae
Apocynaceae genera
Endemic flora of Brazil